The Texas State Cemetery (TSC) is a cemetery located on about  just east of downtown Austin, the capital of the U.S. state of Texas. Originally the burial place of Edward Burleson, Texas Revolutionary general and vice-president of the Republic of Texas, it was expanded into a Confederate cemetery during the Civil War. Later it was expanded again to include the graves and cenotaphs of prominent Texans and their spouses.

It is a popular tourist attraction and colloquially referred to as the "Arlington of Texas" because of the renown of those interred and proximity to the seat of government.

The cemetery is divided into two sections. The smaller one contains around 900 graves of prominent Texans, while the larger has over 2,000 marked graves of Confederate veterans and widows.  There is room for 7,500 interments; the cemetery is about half full, after including plots chosen by people who are eligible for burial.

Burial guidelines
The guidelines on who may be buried within the Texas State Cemetery were first established in 1953, and are currently set by Texas state law. Currently, all persons to be buried in the cemetery must be one of the following:
 A former member of the legislature or a member who dies in office.
 A former elected state official or an official who dies in office (e.g., Governors of Texas, Lieutenant Governors of Texas, state Attorneys-General and departmental commissioners).
 State official appointed by the governor and confirmed by the Legislature who served at least 10 years in the office. After September 1, 2015, this criterion may be used only upon approval of the State Cemetery Committee if it finds the official made a significant contribution to Texas history.
 Individual designated by governor's proclamation, concurrent resolution of the Legislature, or order of the State Cemetery Committee; but only after approval of the committee if it finds the individual made a significant contribution to Texas history. The statute as written permits the committee to deny burial under this criterion even if requested by the governor or Legislature.
 The spouse of anyone meeting the above criteria.
 The child of an eligible member, but only if he or she was dependent on another due to a long-standing physical or mental condition during the lifetime of one of the child's parents.

History

After the death of Edward Burleson in 1851, the Texas Legislature arranged for his burial on land formerly belonging to Andrew Jackson Hamilton. In 1854, the Legislature established a monument at Burleson's grave-site for $1,000 and purchased the surrounding land. The burial ground was virtually ignored until the Civil War, when Texas Confederate officers killed in battle were buried there. In 1864 and 1866 more land was purchased for veterans' burials. The remaining Union soldier is Antonio Briones, who was left at the request of his family. He is interred alone in the far northeast corner of the cemetery.

Because the Texas Confederate Men's Home and the Confederate Women's Home were located in Austin, more than two thousand Confederate veterans and widows are interred at the State Cemetery. Most were buried after 1889. The last Confederate veterans in the Cemetery were reinterred in 1944; the last widow, in 1963.

In 1932, the State Cemetery was little known and had no roads. There was a dirt road running through the grounds of the Cemetery linked to what was then called Onion Creek Highway. The road kept its highway status when Texas historian Louis Kemp brought it to the attention of the Texas Highway Department that the road running through the Cemetery should be paved. The roads, which are officially designated as State Highway 165, are dedicated to Kemp, and were for a time known as "Lou Kemp Highway". Kemp was also the driving force behind the reinterment of many early Texas figures in time for the Texas Centennial in 1936.

The cemetery was added to the National Register of Historic Places in 1986, but by the early 1990s, the State Cemetery had fallen into disrepair—suffering from vandalism and decay—and was unsafe to visit. In 1994, after noting the condition of the Cemetery, Lieutenant Governor Bob Bullock initiated a three-year project that added a visitor center and renovated the cemetery. In 1997, there was a re-dedication and a reopening of the State Cemetery.

A three-person Texas State Cemetery committee oversees operations at the cemetery. Thomas N. "Tom" Sellers (appointed by Governor Greg Abbott) is chairman. James L. Bayless (Speaker's appointment) and Carolyn Hodges (appointee of the lieutenant governor) also serve. Nathan Stephens is the Administrator and the senior historian is Will Erwin.

Former Governor and United States President George W. Bush announced his intention to be buried in the State Cemetery. However, in August 2018, Bush decided he and his wife will be buried at his presidential center following their deaths.

Statistics
As of 2023, buried in the Texas State Cemetery are:

Davis Guards Medal recipients
 Michael Carr (Section:Confederate Field, Section 2 (D) Row:Q Number:34)
 David Fitzgerald (Section:Confederate Field, Section 1 (F) Row:P Number:7)
 John Flood (Section:Confederate Field, Section 2 (D) Row:V Number:21)
 William Hardin (Section:Confederate Field, Section 1 (F) Row:K Number:15)
 Thomas Sullivan (Confederate Field, Section 2 (D) Row:U Number:18)

Battle of San Jacinto veterans

Notable interments

 Joseph Hugh Allen
 Betty Andujar
 Bob Armstrong
 Stephen F. Austin
 Moseley Baker
 Don Baylor
 Cedric Benson
 George Beto
 Anita Lee Blair
 Paul Bolton
 Andrew Briscoe
 Guy M. Bryan
 Benjamin F. Bryant
 Augustus Buchel
 Bob Bullock
 Edward Burleson
 Gregory Scott Coleman
 Waggoner Carr
 Phil Cates
 Gene Cernan
 George Christian
 John B. Connally
 Nellie Connally
 Wayne Connally (cremated, with cenotaph)
 Barbara Smith Conrad
 James Cotton
 Trammel Crow
 Russell B. Cummings
 Walter Cunningham
 Edmund J. Davis
 Susanna Dickinson
 J. Frank Dobie
 John Holt Duncan
 Alexander Campbell Earle (co-founder of Delta Tau Delta (ΔΤΔ) Fraternity)
 Ray Farabee
 James E. Ferguson
 Miriam A. "Ma" Ferguson
 Joe Bertram Frantz
 Fred Gipson
 Lena Guerrero
 James Washington Guinn
 Dorsey B. Hardeman
 Warren G. Harding (Texas politician)
 John Hemphill
 James Pinckney Henderson
 Jack English Hightower
 Paul John Hilbert
 Andrew Jackson Houston
 John Ireland
 Patrick Churchill Jack
 William Houston Jack
 Barbara Jordan
 Albert Sidney Johnston
 Delwin Jones
 William Wayne Justice
 Larry L. King
 Dan Kubiak
 Edmund Kuempel
 Chris Kyle (US Navy SEAL)
 Tom Landry (cenotaph)
 Thomas C. Lea, III
 Ray Allen Lemmon (Texas House of Representatives for the 61st and 62nd Legislatures)
 Frank Madla
 Benjamin McCulloch
 George "Spanky" McFarland
 Crawford Martin
 Jim Mattox
 William Menefee
 James A. Michener (cenotaph)
 Dan Moody
 Richard Moya
 Jose Antonio Navarro
 James E. Nugent
 Richard Arvin Overton
 William Neff "Bill" Patman
 Randy Pendleton
 J. J. Pickle
 William C. Powers Jr.
 Richard "Cactus" Pryor
 Irma Lerma Rangel
 Ann Richards
 Sterling C. Robertson
 Joel Walter Robison
 Darrell K. Royal
 Jerry Sadler
 William Read Scurry
 Allan Shivers
 E L Short
 Edwin "Bud" Shrake
 Preston E. Smith
 W. E. "Pete" Snelson
 James Austin Sylvester
 Alexander Watkins Terrell
 Ernest O. Thompson
 May Peterson Thompson
 Homer Thornberry
 Sidney Johnson Thomas
 John G. Tower (cenotaph)
 Joanna Troutman
 Byron M. Tunnell
 William A. A. "Bigfoot" Wallace
 Gary Watkins (cenotaph)
 Walter Prescott Webb
 Willie Wells
 George E. "Buddy" West
 John A. Wharton
 Mark White
 James Charles Wilson
 Will Wilson
 Charlie Wilson (Cenotaph)
 Ralph Yarborough

Governors of Texas 
 Peter Hansbrough Bell
 John Bowden Connally Jr.
 Edmund Jackson Davis
 Miriam "Ma" Amanda Ferguson
 James "Pa" Edward Ferguson
 James Pinckney Henderson
 John Ireland
 Francis Richard Lubbock
 Dan Moody Jr.
 Ann Willis Richards
 Hardin Richard Runnels
 Robert Allan Shivers
 Preston Earnest Smith
 Mark Wells White

Texas Rangers 
 Stephen F. Austin
 Willis Thomas Avery
 Jesse Billingsley
 Joseph Graves Booth
 John Watkins Bracken
 Guy Morrison Bryan
 Ben Franklin Bryant
 George Christopher Brakefield
 Edward Burleson
 James Hughes Callahan
 Walter P. Callaway
 William Angelo Dial
 Homer Garrison
 John Grumbles
 Joseph Sidney Fletcher
 William Polk Hardeman
 John Reynolds Hughes
 Ben McCulloch
 Charles Edward Miller
 Daniel Webster Roberts
 James Lambert "Skippy" Rundell
 William Read Scurry
 Lamartine Pemberton "Lamar" Seeker
 William Tom
 William Alexander Anderson "Big Foot" Wallace
 Eleazar Louis Ripley Wheelock
 John Lemon Wilbarger
 Robert McAlpin Williamson
 Thomas C. Wilson
 William Delpard Wilson

Other 
 1 Navy SEAL
 5 Lieutenant Governors of Texas
 5 Speakers of the Texas House of Representatives
 15 Signers of the Texas Declaration of Independence
 3 U.S. Senators
 6 U.S. Representatives
 5 First Ladies of Texas (including planned burial plots for Anita Thigpen Perry who are still alive)
 5 authors
 11 Republic of Texas veterans
 9 Confederate Generals
 3 Medal of Honor recipients
 2 American Revolutionary War veterans
 1 17th-century French sailor (remains discovered in the wreck of La Salle's ship La Belle in 1996)
 First Texas Solicitor General
 1 member of the Baseball Hall of Fame
 2 astronauts
 1 president of the University of Texas at Austin
 1 football player
 1 notable supercenterian

Popular culture
 In one episode of King of the Hill, Cotton Hill is awarded a plot in the Texas State Cemetery for his heroism during World War II. However, Cotton is never buried in this plot when he dies in another episode. Actor Barry Jenner, who appeared in 27 episodes of the 1980s television series Dallas, is also awarded a plot.

Gallery

See also 
 List of cemeteries in Texas

References

External links

 
 Texas State Cemetery searchable database. One can search by name or by location in the cemetery.
 
 Political Graveyard list of politicians buried in the Texas State Cemetery.
 Where They R.I.P. Site dedicated to finding the burial locations of Texas's elected officials from the Republic Era to statehood.  Includes lists of African-American legislators, governors and other elected officials.
 

1851 establishments in Texas
Cemeteries in Austin, Texas
Cemeteries on the National Register of Historic Places in Texas
Culture of Austin, Texas
National Register of Historic Places in Austin, Texas